Nico Serfontein is a South African rugby football coach and former rugby league footballer who represented South Africa at the 1995 Rugby League World Cup.

Playing career
Serfontein played rugby union as a Blue Bulls junior. Nico's main claim to fame in rugby league was his stint in the early nineties at Hemel Hempstead, a Hertfordshire based club in England. In 1995 he played rugby league for South Africa at the 1995 World Cup.

Coaching career
Serfontein later became a successful rugby union coach, coaching the Blue Bulls' Vodacom Cup and junior sides. While at the Bulls he won two Vodacom Cups, three Under-21 titles finals and two Under-19 titles.

In 2011, he was signed by the Golden Lions to run their junior programmes.

He has been involved with the Baby Boks under former coach Eric Sauls and at the 2012 IRB Junior World Championship.

References

Living people
South African rugby league players
South Africa national rugby league team players
South African rugby union players
1968 births
South African rugby union coaches